The 1988 UEFA Super Cup was played between KV Mechelen and PSV Eindhoven, with Mechelen winning 3–1 on aggregate.

Match details

First leg

Second leg

KV Mechelen won 3–1 on aggregate.

See also
1987–88 European Cup
1987–88 European Cup Winners' Cup
PSV Eindhoven in European football

References

External links
 Summary from UEFA
 Summary from RSSSF

Super Cup
1988
Super Cup 1988
Super Cup 1988
Super Cup 1988
Super Cup 1988
Super Cup
Super Cup
Sports competitions in Eindhoven
20th century in Eindhoven
February 1989 sports events in Europe